Diósgyőr-Vasgyári Testgyakorlók Köre is a professional football club based in Miskolc, Hungary.

Managers
 Károly Jáhn (1937), (3)
 Pál Teleki (1937–39)
 Károly Csapkay (1939–42), (95)
 Dezső Wetzer (1942–43), (20)
 József Tomecskó (1943–44)
 Jónás Móré (1945–46), (36)
 Sándor Barna (1946–47), (24)
 Jenő Detrich (1947), (12)
 József Ádám (1947–49), (42)
 Sándor Felföldi (1949)
 József Tomecskó (1950–52), (101)
 Pál Szabó (1952), (45)
 Pál Jávor (1953–55), (58)
 Béla Jánosi (1953–54), (24)
 Sándor Felföldi (1956–57), (34)
 János Steiner (1957), (11)
 Pál Teleki (1957–58), (88)
 Gábor Kiss (1958–60), (39)
 Gyula Bodola (1960–61), (35)
 József Mágori (1961), (6)
 Márton Bukovi (1962–63), (46)
 György Nagy (1963–65), (53)
 Kálmán Preiner (1965–66)
 Pál Szabó (1967), (45)
 Gyula Teleki (1968), (23)
 Gusztáv Sebes (1968)
 Oszkár Szigeti (1968), (7)
 Sándor Tátrai (1969–70), (51)
 József Tóth (1970–71), (10)
 Imre Mathesz (1970–72), (45)
 Kálmán Preiner (1972–74), (105)
 Géza Szabó (1974–81), (215)
 István Deák (1981), (14)
 Lajos Puskás (1981–83), (64)
 Ferenc Fekete (1983–84), (18)
 Imre Hajas (1984), (12)
 László Bánkuti (1984–86), (61)
 Béla Gál (1986), (34)
 György Száger (1987–88), (57)
 Dr. Gábor Petróczy (1988–89), (27)
 László Kiss (1989), (3)
 Tibor Palicskó (1989–91), (60)
 László Vlad (1991–92), (19)
 Barnabás Tornyi (1992), (11)
 István Sándor (1992–93), (45)
 Antal Szentmihályi (1994), (6)
 Vilmos Kálmán (1994), (3)
 László Szepessy (1994), (6)
 Ferenc Oláh (1994–95), (41)
 Zoltán Leskó (1995–96), (7)
 József Verebes (1996), (12)
 Barnabás Tornyi (1996–98), (51)
 Gábor Szapor (1999, spring), (7)
 Miklós Temesvári (1999–00), (27)
 Zoltán Varga (2000), (9)
 Géza Huszák (2000), (7)
 János Pajkos (05/02/2002–01/04/2003)
 Károly Gergely (03/07/2003–03/12/2003)
 Tibor Őze (2004)
 Lajos Détári (2004), (0)
 József Kiprich (04/08/2004–28/09/2004), (6)
 György Gálhidi (28/09/2004–23/09/2005), (23)
 János Pajkos/ Zoran Kuntić (23/09/2005–18/10/2005), (10)
 János Pajkos (21/10/2005–09/06/2006), (15)
 János Csank (01/07/2006–07), (30)
 János Pajkos (04/07/2007–29/09/2007), (10)
 Attila Vágó (01/10/2007–25/09/2008), (27)
 Miklós Benczés (2008), (2)
 Tibor Sisa (15/10/2008–31/12/2008), (5)
 György Gálhidi (01/01/2009–03/06/2009), (15)
 Zoltán Aczél (17/07/2009–30/12/2009), (15)
 Barnabás Tornyi (04 January 2010–07 April 2010), (6)
 László Tóth (08 April 2010–06 May 2010), (5)
 Miklós Benczés (07 May 2010-02 April 2012), (?)
 Lázár Szentes (02 April 2012–14 June 2012), (8)
 Tibor Sisa (14 June 2012–22 November 2012), (15)
 Lázár Szentes (22 November 2012–17 April 2013), (8)
 Zoltan Kovács (17 April 2013–03 June 2013), (7)
 Tomislav Sivić (01 June 2013–28 April 2015), (54)
 Zoltán Vitelki (28 April 2015-01 June 2015), "(6)"
 Balázs Bekő (01 June 2015-14 December 2015), "(19)"
 Sándor Egervári (29 December 2015–26 June 2016) "(14)"
 Ferenc Horváth (30 June 2016–02 March 2017)
 Zoltán Vitelki (interim manager)
 Tamás Bódog (09 March 2017–23 April 2018)
 Fernando (23 April 2018–3 September 2019)
 Tamás Feczkó (4 September 2019–8 December 2020)
 Gergely Geri (8 December 2020-7 January 2021)
 Zoran Zekić (7 January 2021-3 May 2021)
 Elemér Kondás (May 2021-8 April 2022)
 Dragan Vukmir (8 April 2022-23 August 2022)
 Serhiy Kuznetsov (24 August 2022-present)

References

External links

Diósgyőri VTK